Cheongpyeong Dam is a dam located in Gyeonggi Province.

Located on the Bukhan River in the southwest of Gapyeong County, it was built in 1943 as the Cheongpyeong hydroelectric power plant. This power plant has an installed capacity of 79,600 kW and an average output of 35,000 kW.

As a power generation dam that mainly produces electricity, it is owned by the Korea Hydro & Nuclear Power Co., Ltd., not the Korea Water Resources Corporation. Electricity produced here is transmitted to Bupyeong District, and although electric power is important, it plays also a large role in regulating the water level of the river. The last unit producing energy was commissioned in 2011; as of 2012 it has 4 units.

Transportation to Seoul attracts many tourists from Gyeongin. In particular, Cheongpyeong Dam has a popular water ski resort, and an American-run foreigner's amusement park even more famous inside the dam.

The landscape around Cheongpyeong Dam is mainly hilly. Cheongpyeong Dam is located down in a valley. In the area around Cheongpyeong Dam, there are mainly mixed forests.

Climate 
The area is mainly continental.

References 

Transport in Gapyeong County
Buildings and structures in Gapyeong County
Hydroelectric power stations in South Korea